The Satellite Award for Outstanding Overall Blu-ray/DVD is an annual award given by the International Press Academy as one of its Satellite Awards.

Winners and nominees

Outstanding Overall DVD

Outstanding Overall Blu-Ray

References

External links
 International Press Academy website

Blu-Ray Overall